This is a list of broadcast television stations that are licensed in the United States territory of Guam.

Full-power stations
"VC" refers to the station's PSIP virtual channel. "RF" refers to the station's physical RF channel.

LPTV stations

Guam

Television stations